Bryan Bishop, frequently referred to on podcasts as Bald Bryan, is an American radio personality and New York Times Best Selling author, best known for his career on The Adam Carolla Show podcast and its previous radio version.

Personal life 
Bishop was born in 1978 and grew up in San Carlos, California. He attended Junípero Serra High School in San Mateo, California where he was a classmate of Tom Brady. He majored in creative writing at the University of Southern California, where he was a founding member of the Pi Kappa Phi fraternity's Delta Rho chapter.

Bryan married Christie Clough, an advertising executive, in 2009.  Their daughter Tessa was born in 2016.

Game show appearances
 In 2002, Bishop was a contestant on  Comedy Central's Beat the Geeks. Bishop won the final challenge in the game by defeating the "Music Geek".
 Bishop appeared on the syndicated game show Who Wants to Be a Millionaire in a two-part episode airing on December 5 and 8, 2008. He won and took home $100,000 after walking away on his $250,000 question.

Broadcasting career 
In May 2002, Bishop began working with Adam Carolla on the radio show Loveline as a call screener. He was fired on June 2, 2005, after blogging inside details of the show.

Bishop also worked on Adam Carolla's Too Late with Adam Carolla TV show. 

On January 2, 2006, Bishop began working on The Adam Carolla Show as a call screener. On May 4, 2006, Bishop filled in for Mike Lynch, the show's sound effects person, while Lynch was getting married. When Lynch was promoted to writer, Bishop became the show's permanent sound effects person and the call screener position was filled by Kyle Baugher. LAist described Bryan as "a sound-effects wizard, and ultra quick-witted third-man".

Role on The Adam Carolla Show 

Bishop occasionally participates in both conversations and performances on the show. One of Bishop's hallmarks is providing prerecorded verbalized and audio commentary by triggering humorous and relevant sound effects. Examples of Bishop's sound effects include the "correct answer" and "incorrect answer" bells/buzzers from Family Feud, or sentences spoken by others on the show, out of context. Bishop's sound effects are often referred to as "drops" on the show.

Bishop is notable on the show for excelling in geek culture-themed competition segments, such as "Totally Topical Tivo Trivia", "Blah, Blah, Blog", "Gay Walking", "Nerd Walking", and "The Rotten Tomatoes Game". Bishop occasionally participates in improvisational elements of the show.

Support for Bishop's fight with cancer and his $100,000 win on Who Wants to be a Millionaire are occasionally discussed on the show.

In January 2023, Carolla announced that Bishop and co-host Gina Grad would not be returning as regulars to the podcast, but would be future guests on the program.

Other broadcasts
Bishop also co-hosts a movie podcast called The Film Vault with former Loveline engineer Anderson Cowan.

Brain tumor 
On Adam Carolla's podcast in May 2009 Bishop stated he was diagnosed with an inoperable brain tumor (a low-grade glioma located in the brainstem). Keith Black, the chairman of neurosurgery at Cedars-Sinai Hospital, referred Bishop to a specialized team who pursued treatment involving radiation and chemotherapy. 

On October 21, 2009, Bishop appeared on Carolla's podcast and reported that his most recent MRI showed that the tumor had shrunk significantly and that treatment was ongoing. Bishop detailed undergoing therapy using the angiogenesis inhibiting drug, Avastin.  Bishop announced on the same podcast that, because he is undergoing radiation treatments which might result in him becoming sterile, he has made deposits at a sperm bank as a precaution in advance of his pending nuptials.  Bishop and his wife had a healthy daughter in 2016 through natural conception.

Carolla hosted a fundraiser "Laughs for Bald Bryan" in November 2009, which included performances by Jimmy Kimmel, Larry Miller, Greg Fitzsimmons, and others.

When Bishop filled in for Carolla on the July 8, 2011, edition of the podcast, he and co-host Alison Rosen discussed his diagnosis and treatment. In discussing the diagnosis, Bishop said his doctors had initially given him "6 months to a year" to live. Bishop also discussed his current treatment regimen.

He has written a book about the experience: Shrinkage: Manhood, Marriage, and the Tumor That Tried to Kill Me, which was published by Thomas Dunne Books in April 2014 and became a New York Times best seller.

References

External links 

 Bryan Bishop on MySpace
 Revealing Bald Bryan Bishop podcast interview about brain cancer
 Story about Bryan's bachelor party on chemotherapy

1978 births
American radio personalities
Living people
People from San Carlos, California
University of Southern California alumni
Junípero Serra High School (San Mateo, California) alumni